Mark Peter Andrew Rohtmaa-Jackson (born 2 February 1976) is an American British curator based in the United Kingdom. He is the curator, and co-founder, of IMT Gallery in London and a senior lecturer in critical theory and curatorial practices at Northumbria University.

Life and work

Jackson originally studied fine art, having a degree in painting from the University of East London and an MA in Fine Art Media from the Slade School of Fine Art. He taught on MA Sound Arts at London College of Communication from 2008 to 2014 and BA Fine Art at Southampton Solent University from 2013 to 2014. He currently teaches art history and critical theory at Northumbria University, Newcastle, where he was the curator of exhibitions at the university's art gallery Gallery North from 2014-18.

Jackson has been the curator at IMT Gallery since the gallery was founded in 2005, specialising in sound art and audiovisual practice, and curating exhibitions including 2010's Dead Fingers Talk: The Tape Experiments of William S. Burroughs, an exhibition of unreleased experiments with audio tape by William S. Burroughs.  He is an authority on Burroughs's experiments with tape, researching a PhD on the tape experiments at University of the Arts London, supervised by Angus Carlyle, and speaking on Burroughs at conferences including Beyond the Cut-up: William S. Burroughs and the Image at The Photographers' Gallery and the Sound Art Curating conference at ZKM. His book on curating, Contemporary Exhibition-Making and Management, was published by Routledge in 2023.

He has also exhibited or performed as an artist, including as part of Plastique Fantastique and NEUSCHLOSS. In 2014 he composed This is a game called ‘Hello, hello, here is X.X.’ a limited-edition art-work in the form of a vinyl made from a recorded interview between Burroughs and journalist Roger Clarke.

External links
website

References 

Living people
1976 births
Alumni of the Slade School of Fine Art
People educated at Bedales School